Raipur is a census town in Dehradun district in the Indian state of Uttarakhand. Situated in the municipal area of Uttarakhand, it's one among the 7 blocks of Dehradun district.

Government institutions 
The Institutions established by the government in Raipur are Maharana Pratap Sports College, INDIA OPTEL LIMITED (earlier known as Ordnance Factory), Instruments Research & Development Establishment (IRDE), and many more.

Geography
It has an average elevation of 663 metres (2,175 feet).

Demographics
As of the 2001 India census, Raipur had a population of 24,887. Males constitute 52% of the population, and females constitute 48%. Raipur has an average literacy rate of 81%, higher than the national average of 59.5%. Male literacy is 85%, and female literacy is 78%. In Raipur, 11% of the population is under 6 years of age.

Schools and colleges 

 KENDRIYA VIDYALAYA  RAIPUR No.1
 KENDRIYA VIDYALAYA OEF DEHRADUN RAIPUR
 PAATHSHALA PLAY SCHOOL
 SAI GRACE INTERNATIONAL SCHOOL
 Govt. Inter College - Raipur
 Govt. P.G. College Maldevta (Raipur) Dehradun
 The OASIS

Historical places 

 Khalanga War Memorial
 Kalinga Smarak

Hospitals 
OFD Hospital.

CHC (Community Health Centre) Raipur.

References

Cities and towns in Dehradun district